Daniel Poulou (born July 28, 1943 in Biarritz) was a member of the National Assembly of France.  He represented  Pyrénées-Atlantiques's 6th constituency, as a member of the Union for a Popular Movement.

References

1943 births
Living people
People from Biarritz
Politicians from Nouvelle-Aquitaine
Union for French Democracy politicians
Union for a Popular Movement politicians
Deputies of the 10th National Assembly of the French Fifth Republic
Deputies of the 11th National Assembly of the French Fifth Republic
Deputies of the 12th National Assembly of the French Fifth Republic
Deputies of the 13th National Assembly of the French Fifth Republic